Pita Jordan Ahki (born 24 September 1992) is a rugby union footballer from New Zealand who plays as a centre for Toulouse in the Top14.

Career
Ahki made his provincial debut in 2011 and ahead of the 2013 season he has made 13 appearances and scored 1 try. His impressive ITM Cup performances have seen him named in the  wider training squad for the 2013 Super Rugby season. 

On 19 October 2017, Connacht announced the signing of Pita as cover for Bundee Aki who is expected to join the Ireland team for the 2017 Autumn International Series. No contract length was specified in the announcement. On 3 March 2018, it was announced that Ahki would leave Connacht to join French club Toulouse in the Top 14 from the 2018-19 season.

International

Ahki played for the Tongan under 20s at the 2011 IRB Junior World Championship.

He also represented New Zealand Sevens between 2012-2016, winning a Silver Medal at the 2014 Commonwealth Games in Glasgow.

Notes

External links
 

1992 births
New Zealand rugby union players
New Zealand people of Chinese descent
New Zealand sportspeople of Samoan descent
New Zealand sportspeople of Tongan descent
North Harbour rugby union players
Blues (Super Rugby) players
Rugby union players from Auckland
Rugby union centres
Living people
New Zealand international rugby sevens players
Commonwealth Games silver medallists for New Zealand
Commonwealth Games rugby sevens players of New Zealand
Rugby sevens players at the 2014 Commonwealth Games
Commonwealth Games medallists in rugby sevens
Connacht Rugby players
Stade Toulousain players
New Zealand expatriate sportspeople in France
New Zealand expatriate rugby union players
New Zealand expatriate sportspeople in Ireland
Expatriate rugby union players in France
Expatriate rugby union players in Ireland
Medallists at the 2014 Commonwealth Games